Tricholosporum violaceum is a species of fungus in the family Tricholomataceae. Found in Costa Rica, the species was described as new to science in 1996.

Taxonomy

The fungus was first described scientifically by mycologists Roy Halling and Ana Franco-Molano. Based on morphology, Tricholosporum violaceum is most similar to T. pseudosordidum and T. tropicalis.

Description

The cap surface is moist, smooth or somewhat covered in tiny scales, and violet in color. The flesh is white to yellowish white, with a mild taste and odor ranging from sour to radish-like to spermatic. Gill attachment ranges from adnexed to emarginate to free. They are closely spaced, white with a lilac tint, and have even to irregular edges. The upper half of the stipe is violet, while the lower half is white. The spore print is white. Spores are smooth, rhomboid shaped, inamyloid, and measure 3.6–5 µm long by 2.8–4.3 µm wide. Clamp connections are present in the hyphae. The basidia are narrowly club-shaped, four-spored, and measure 21–30 by 5–6 µm. Both pleurocystidia and cheilocystidia are present in the hymenium; they are similar in morphology, with dimensions of 31–60 by 7–9 µm.

Habitat and distribution

Fruit bodies of Tricholosporum violaceum grow on the ground, and may associate with oaks, although its mycorrhizal status is unknown. The fungus is found in Costa Rica, where it has been recorded from Las Tablas Protected Zone and near the Monteverde Cloud Forest Preserve.

References

External links

violaceum
Fungi of Central America
Fungi described in 1996